Pakistan competed at the 2020 Summer Paralympics in Tokyo, Japan, from 24 August to 5 September 2021. It sent two athletes, one of either gender to compete in athletics (discus throw).

Medalists

Athletics 

One Pakistani male athlete, Haider Ali (Discus Throw F37), successfully to break through the qualifications for the 2020 Paralympics after breaking the qualification limit.

Anila Izzat Baig will be participating in the F64 Discus Throw. She is first Pakistani female para athlete who is competing in the Paralymics. She ended at 10th place 
in F64 Discus Throw.

References 

2020
Nations at the 2020 Summer Paralympics
2021 in Pakistani sport